Lordi is a Finnish hard rock/heavy metal band formed in 1992 by the band's lead singer, songwriter and costume-designer, Mr Lordi. The band is known for wearing monster masks and using pyrotechnics during concerts. They rose to domestic success in 2002 with their first single, "Would You Love a Monsterman?". The band's eleventh through their seventeenth studio albums were released as part of the box set Lordiversity.

Albums

Studio albums

Compilations

Singles
"Would You Love a Monsterman?" (2002)
"Devil Is a Loser" (2003)
"My Heaven Is Your Hell" (2004)
"Blood Red Sandman" (2004)
"Hard Rock Hallelujah" (2006)
"Who's Your Daddy?" (2006)
"It Snows in Hell" (2006)
"They Only Come Out at Night" (2007)
"Beast Loose in Paradise" (2008)
"Bite It Like a Bulldog" (2008)
"Deadache" (2008)
"This Is Heavy Metal" (2010)
"The Riff" (2013)
"Nailed by the Hammer of Frankenstein" (2014)
"Hug You Hardcore" (2016)
"Your Tongue's Got the Cat" (2018)
"Naked in My Cellar" (2018)
"Shake the Baby Silent" (2019)
"I Dug a Hole in the Yard for You" (2019)
"Like a Bee to the Honey" (2020)
"Believe Me" (2021)
"Abracadaver" (2021)
"Borderline" (2021)
"Merry Blah Blah Blah" (2021)
"Demon Supreme" (2021)
"Day Off of the Devil" (2022)
"Spear of the Romans" (2022)
"Reel Monsters" (2022)
"Lucyfer Prime Evil" (2023)
"Thing in the Cage" (2023)

Videos

Music videos
 "Would You Love a Monsterman?" (2002)
 "Devil Is a Loser" (2003)
 "Blood Red Sandman" (2004)
 "Hard Rock Hallelujah" (2006)
 "Who's Your Daddy?" (2006)
 "Would You Love a Monsterman 2006" (2006)
 "It Snows in Hell" (2006)
 "Hard Rock Hallelujah" (Eurovision Song Contest, 2007)
 "Bite It Like a Bulldog" (2008)
 "This Is Heavy Metal" (2010)
 "The Riff" (2013)
 "Scare Force One" (2014)
 "Hug You Hardcore" (2016)
 "Naked in My Cellar" (2018)
 "I Dug a Hole in the Yard for You" (2019)
 "Believe Me" (2021)
 "Abracadaver" (2021)
 "Borderline" (2021)
 "Merry Blah Blah Blah" (2021)
 "Reel Monsters" (2022)

Lyric videos
 "The Riff" (2013)
 "Nailed by the Hammer of Frankenstein" (2014)
 "Your Tongue’s Got the Cat" (2018)
 "Shake the Baby Silent" (2019)
 "Like a Bee to the Honey" (2020)
 "Demon Supreme" (2022)
 "Better Hate Than Never" (2022)
 "Lucyfer Prime Evil" (2023)
 "Thing in the Cage" (2023)

Video albums
 Market Square Massacre (2006)
 Bringing Back the Balls to Stockholm (2007)
 Recordead Live – Sextourcism in Z7 (2019)

References

Heavy metal group discographies
Discographies of Finnish artists